The federal electoral redistribution of 2022 is a redistribution of electoral districts ("ridings") in Canada following the results of the 2021 Canadian census. The Constitution of Canada requires that federal electoral districts which compose the House of Commons undergo a redistribution of boundaries following each decennial Canadian census. The redistribution process began in October 2021; it is expected to be completed in September 2023. It is based on data obtained during the 2021 Canadian census.

The changes to federal electoral district boundaries may take effect at the earliest in 2024. If the next federal election occurs before the new electoral boundaries have been established, it will occur with the current electoral district boundaries, which have been in effect since the 2015 federal election was called on August 4, 2015.

The redistribution formula for federal electoral districts which compose the House of Commons is set out in Section 51 of the Constitution Act, 1867. The formula in Section 51 was amended to its current form in 2022 by the Preserving Provincial Representation in the House of Commons Act. Section 52 permits additional seats to be added to the House of Commons provided proportionate representation between the provinces is maintained.

Under the Electoral Boundaries Readjustment Act, to redistribute the electoral boundaries within each province, ten independent electoral boundary commissions will be established, one for each province. The commissions are composed of three members, one appointed by the chief justice of each province, and two members appointed by the Speaker of the House of Commons. Nunavut, the Northwest Territories and the Yukon do not require commissions as each territory is allotted only a single member of the House of Commons, resulting in the entirety of the each territory being a single electoral district.

Initial allocation of seats
The initial allocation of seats to the provinces and territories was based on rules in the Constitution of Canada established in 2012 by the Fair Representation Act as well as estimates of the Canadian population on July 1, 2021 made by Statistics Canada. The Chief Electoral Officer announced the allocation of seats on 15 October 2021.

Passage of the Preserving Provincial Representation in the House of Commons Act

Notwithstanding the Chief Electoral Officer's announcement, Parliament retained certain powers to amend the Constitution Act, 1867 and thus the redistricting process. Such a change occurred during the 2012 redistribution. Amendments affecting proportionate representation between the provinces, however, required support of seven provinces representing at least 50% of the population of Canada.

Several days after the Chief Electoral Officer's announcement of the allocation, Quebec provincial Minister of Justice Sonia LeBel said that Quebec's "special status" as Canada's "only francophone province" meant that the province must not lose any seats. LeBel said the province represents one of the "founding peoples of Canada" saying that represents much more than "a simple calculation of population". In November 2021, both the Premier of Quebec François Legault and the opposition Bloc Québécois also called for Quebec to maintain its current number of seats of 78.

The same month, The Toronto Star editorial board called for further seats to be added in Ontario, British Columbia and Alberta, to provide fair representation for voters in those provinces. It also said calls to institute a minimum threshold of seats for Quebec should be rejected. The Globe and Mail'''s editorial board also called on Parliament to add additional seats to ensure the principle of "one person, one vote" would be realized.

On February 8, 2022, BQ Shadow Minister Martin Champoux introduced a private member's bill entitled An Act to amend the Constitution Act, 1867 (representation in the House of Commons). The bill proposed that Quebec would be guaranteed never to be allotted less than 25% of the seats in the House. This had previously been a provision in the failed 1992 Charlottetown Accord. The bill was defeated at second reading on June 8, 2022 by a vote of 51-264, with the BQ and NDP voting for the bill, and the Liberals and Conservatives voting against the bill.

On March 2, 2022, the House of Commons called for the rules for apportioning seats to be amended in a non-binding motion. The motion was introduced by the Bloc to avoid Quebec losing a seat in the House of Commons. Following the vote, a government announced it would reject any scenario where Quebec loses a seat and would be working on a way to the current number of Quebec seats will be maintained. Following the announcement, Conservative MP Michelle Rempel Garner said that the decision could contribute to western alienation and raised new questions about Canada's electoral system. She said Conservatives should consider advocating for the adoption of proportional representation.

On March 24, 2022, the government tabled legislation to prevent Quebec (or any other province) from losing any seats relative to the number of seats it was apportioned in 2012 Canadian federal electoral redistribution. Bill C-14 amended Rule 2 of subsection 51(1) of the Constitution Act, 1867, commonly known as the "Grandfather Clause". The Bill passed the House of Commons on June 15, 2022, passed the Senate on June 21, 2022, and received royal assent on June 23, 2022.

The Chief Electoral Officer announced the new allocation of seats under the Preserving Provincial Representation in the House of Commons Act'' on 8 July 2022.

Initial proposals

Alberta
On June 10, 2022, the Federal Electoral Boundaries Commission for Alberta released their initial proposal, proposing the following ridings:

Airdrie—Chestermere; new district, takes in the Airdrie area from Banff—Airdrie and the Chestermere area from Bow River
Battle River—Crowfoot; expanded to take in the Alberta side of Lloydminster, Vegreville, portions of Beaver County and Minburn County from Lakeland; loses much of its area to Bow River
Bow River; expanded to include the town of Bowden, village of Elnora, and portions of Red Deer County and Mountain View County from Red Deer—Mountain View; the M.D. of Acadia No. 34, Starland County, Special Area No. 2 and No. 3, portions of Stettler County from Battle River—Crowfoot; portions of Cypress County including CFB Suffield from Medicine Hat—Cardston—Warner; portions of Lethbridge County from Lethbridge; 
Calgary Centre
Calgary Confederation
Calgary Crowchild; largely replaces Calgary Rocky Ridge 
Calgary Forest Lawn
Calgary Heritage
Calgary McKnight; new district, takes in the Calgary neighbourhoods of Sadle Ridge, Martindale, Taradale, Castleridge, Falconridge, Whitehorn and Temple from Calgary Skyview and the neighbourhoods of Coral Springs, Monterey Park, Rundle and Prineridge from Calgary Forest Lawn
Calgary Midnapore
Calgary Nose Hill
Calgary Shepard
Calgary Signal Hill
Calgary Skyview
Canmore—Cochrane—Olds; new district, takes in the Canmore and Cochrane areas from Banff—Airdrie plus the Olds area from Red Deer—Mountain View
Edmonton Centre; expanded to take in the Edmonton neighbourhoods of Boyle Street, McCauley; portions of the neighbourhoods of Cromdale and Alberta Avenue from Edmonton Griesbach
Edmonton Gateway; new district, takes in the Edmonton neighbourhoods of Tweddle Place, Richfield, Lee Ridge, Tipaskan, Kameyosek, Meyonohk, Ekota, Satoo and Menisa from Edmonton Mill Woods; the neighbourhoods of Steinhauer, Ermineskin, Keheewin, Bearspaw, Blackburn, Richford and the western half of Duggan from Edmonton Riverbend; and the neighbourhoods of Ellerslie, Summerside, the Orchards at Ellerslie, Rutherford, Blackbud Creek, Cavanagh, Callaghan and Allard from Edmonton—Wetaskiwin 
Edmonton Griesbach; expanded to take in the Edmonton neighbourhoods of Ozerna, Mayliewan, Belle Rive, Eaux Claires, Beaumaris, Lorelei, Klarvatten, and Lago Lindo from Edmonton Manning; the neighbourhoods of Canossa, Chambery, Elsinore, and Baturyn from St. Albert—Edmonton
Edmonton Manning; expanded to take in the Edmonton neighbourhoods of Bergman, Beacon Heights, Rundle Heights, and Abbottsfield from Edmonton Griesbach
Edmonton Mill Woods; expanded to take in the Edmonton neighbourhood of Charlesworth, a portion of Walker, and southeast rural areas to city limits from Edmonton—Wetaskiwin 
Edmonton Riverbend; expanded to take in the Edmonton neighbourhoods of Glenridding Heights, Glenridding Ravine, Keswick, Hays Ridge, Graydon Hill, Paisley, Chappelle, Desrochers, and southwest rural areas to city limits from Edmonton—Wetaskiwin
Edmonton Strathcona; expanded to take in the Edmonton neighbourhoods of Rideau Park, Royal Gardens, Aspen Gardens, and a portion of Duggan from Edmonton Riverbend
Edmonton West; expanded to take in the Edmonton neighbourhood of Windermere from Edmonton Riverbend; the neighbourhoods of Patricia Heights, Rio Terrace, Quesnell Heights, Lynnwood, Jasper Park, Sherwood, Parkview, and Laurier Heights from Edmonton Centre
Edmonton Winterburn; new district, takes in the Edmonton neighbourhoods of Mayfield, Britannia Youngstown, Glenwood, Terra Losa, La Perle, Belmead, Secord, Rosenthal, Stewart Greens, Webber Greens, Suder Greens, Breckenridge Greens, Potter Greens and Westview Village from Edmonton West; the neighbourhoods of Hawkes Ridge, Trumpeter, Starling, Albany, Rapperswill, Carlton, Oxford, Dunluce, Cumberland, Hudson, Baranow, Caernarvon, Pembina and Carlisle from St. Albert—Edmonton; and the neighbourhoods of Wellington, Athlone, Calder and Kensington from Edmonton Griesbach 
Foothills; expanded to take in the Blood 148 and 148A reserves from Medicine Hat—Cardston—Warner; the town of Vulcan and portions of Vulcan County from Bow River; and portions of Lethbridge County from Lethbridge
Fort McMurray—Cold Lake
Grande Prairie; largely replaces Grande Prairie—Mackenzie; loses Mackenzie County to Peace River—Westlock
Lakeland; expanded to take in Fort Saskatchewan and portions of Strathcona County from Sherwood Park—Fort Saskatchewan; the towns of Redwater, Gibbons, portions of Sturgeon County from Sturgeon River—Parkland
Lethbridge; loses a large portion of Lethbridge County to Bow River and Foothills
Medicine Hat—Cardston—Warner; expanded to take in the town of Taber, village of Barnwell, and portions of the M.D. of Taber from Bow River
Peace River—Westlock; expanded to take in Mackenzie County from Grande Prairie—Mackenzie; Birch Cove and portions of Lac Ste. Anne County from Sturgeon River—Parkland
Red Deer; new district, unites all of Red Deer in one riding, plus some rural area south and southeast of the city 
Sherwood Park—Beaumont; new district, takes in Sherwood Park area from Sherwood Park—Fort Saskatchewan and the Beaumont area from Edmonton—Wetaskiwin 
Spruce Grove—Leduc; new district; takes in Spruce Grove area from Sturgeon River—Parkland and the Leduc area from Edmonton—Wetaskiwin 
Sturgeon River; new district; includes much of Sturgeon County and St. Albert 
Wetaskiwin—Lacombe; new district, takes in the Wetaskiwin area from Edmonton—Wetaskiwin  and the Lacombe area from Red Deer—Lacombe
Yellowhead; expanded to take in Banff National Park and the town of Banff from Banff—Airdrie; portions of Wetaskiwin County from Edmonton—Wetaskiwin; portions of Wetaskiwin County, Clearwater County and Ponoka County from Red Deer—Lacombe; and portions of Lac Ste. Anne County from Sturgeon River—Parkland

British Columbia
On May 2, 2022, the Federal Electoral Boundaries Commission for British Columbia released their initial proposal, proposing the following ridings:

Abbotsford
Burnaby North—Seymour
Burnaby South
Cariboo—Prince George
Chilliwack: Replaces Chilliwack—Hope; loses Hope; gains some of the Sumas Prairie area of Abbotsford
Cloverdale—Langley City
Coquihalla: Replaces Central Okanagan—Similkameen—Nicola
Coquitlam—Port Coquitlam
Courtenay—Alberni 
Cowichan—Malahat—Langford: No boundary changes proposed.
Delta 
Esquimalt—Saanich—Sooke
Fleetwood—Port Kells
Kamloops—Thompson—Lytton: Replaces Kamloops—Thompson—Cariboo
Kelowna: New district; contains Kelowna part of Central Okanagan—Similkameen—Nicola and southern and eastern parts of Kelowna—Lake Country
Kootenay—Columbia
Langley—Aldergrove
Mission—Maple Ridge: New district; contains eastern half of Maple Ridge from Pitt Meadows—Maple Ridge; and Mission and Agassiz from Mission—Matsqui—Fraser Canyon
Nanaimo—Ladysmith
New Westminster—Bridgeview: Replaces New Westminster—Burnaby, and includes the Bridgeview neighbourhood of Surrey
North Island—Powell River: Gains the eastern half of Courtenay from Courtenay—Alberni
North Okanagan—Shuswap
North Vancouver
Pitt Meadows—Fort Langley: New district; contains Pitt Meadows and the western half of Maple Ridge from Pitt Meadows—Maple Ridge; Surrey Bend area from Fleetwood—Port Kells; and northern third of Langley Township from Langley—Aldergrove
Port Moody—Coquitlam
Prince George—Peace River—Northern Rockies: Gains area north of the Cariboo Highway and west of the Fraser River in Prince George from Cariboo—Prince George
Richmond East; Replaces Steveston—Richmond East. Gains Queensborough from New Westminster—Burnaby; loses Steveston.
Richmond West; Replaces Richmond Centre. Gains Steveston from Steveston—Richmond East.
Saanich—Gulf Islands
Skeena—Bulkley Valley: No boundary changes proposed.
South Okanagan—West Kootenay
South Surrey—White Rock
Surrey Centre
Surrey West: Replaces Surrey—Newton 
Vancouver Centre
Vancouver East
Vancouver Granville
Vancouver Kingsway
Vancouver Quadra
Vancouver South
Vernon—Lake Country: New district; Contains northern half of Kelowna and Lake Country, from Kelowna—Lake Country; and Vernon area from North Okanagan—Shuswap. 
Victoria: No boundary changes proposed.
West Vancouver—Sunshine Coast—Sea to Sky Country

Manitoba
On June 16, 2022, the Federal Electoral Boundaries Commission for Manitoba released their initial proposal, proposing the following ridings:
Brandon—Souris: Loses Virden and the former Rural Municipality of Wallace and gains the CFB Shilo area from Dauphin—Swan River—Neepawa; gains the Municipality of Lorne, the Municipality of Pembina and Swan Lake 7 from Portage—Lisgar.  
Churchill—Keewatinook Aski: Gains the Rural Municipality of Mountain, the Municipality of Minitonas – Bowsman, and the remainder of Division No. 19 not already in the riding from Dauphin—Swan River—Neepawa; Gains the Obushkudayang and Little Saskatchewan 48 area from Selkirk—Interlake—Eastman
Dauphin—Swan River—Neepawa: Loses the Rural Municipality of Mountain, the Municipality of Minitonas – Bowsman, and the parts of Division No. 19 in the riding to Churchill—Keewatinook Aski; Gains Virden and the former Rural Municipality of Wallace and loses the CFB Shilo area to Brandon—Souris; Gains the Municipality of Norfolk Treherne and the area around Long Plain 6 from Portage—Lisgar.
Elmwood—Transcona: Loses the Winnipeg neighbourhood of Grassie to Kildonan—St. Paul; Gains that part of the Rural Municipality of Springfield located within the Red River Floodway from Provencher; Gains the Winnipeg neighbourhood of Southland Park from St. Boniface—St. Vital
Kildonan—St. Paul: Gains the Winnipeg neighbourhood of Grassie from Elmwood—Transcona; Loses the Winnipeg neighbourhood of Leila North to Winnipeg North. 
Portage—Lisgar: Loses the Municipality of Lorne, the Municipality of Pembina and Swan Lake 7 to Brandon—Souris; Loses the Municipality of Norfolk Treherne and the area around Long Plain 6 to Dauphin—Swan River—Neepawa; Gains the Rural Municipality of Woodlands from Selkirk—Interlake—Eastman; Loses the Rural Municipality of St. François Xavier and the Rural Municipality of Cartier to Winnipeg West; Gains the Rural Municipality of De Salaberry, the Rural Municipality of Montcalm, the Municipality of Emerson-Franklin, and the Village of St-Pierre-Jolys, and the Indian Reserves of Roseau River 2 and Roseau Rapids 2A from Provencher
Provencher: Loses the Rural Municipality of De Salaberry, the Rural Municipality of Montcalm, the Municipality of Emerson-Franklin, and the Village of St-Pierre-Jolys, and the Indian Reserves of Roseau River 2 and Roseau Rapids 2A to Portage—Lisgar; Loses that part of the Rural Municipality of Springfield located within the Red River Floodway to Elmwood—Transcona; Loses the Rural Municipality of Whitemouth to Selkirk—Interlake—Eastman
St. Boniface—St. Vital: Loses the Winnipeg neighbourhood of Southland Park from Elmwood—Transcona; Gains the neighbourhood of Minnetonka from Winnipeg South
Selkirk—Interlake—Eastman: Loses the Obushkudayang and Little Saskatchewan 48 area to Churchill—Keewatinook Aski; loses the Rural Municipality of Woodlands to Portage—Lisgar; gains the Rural Municipality of Whitemouth from Provencher 
Winnipeg Centre: Gains the Winnipeg neighbourhoods of North Point Douglas, Lord Selkirk Park and the eastern half of Dufferin from Winnipeg North
Winnipeg North: Loses the Winnipeg neighbourhoods of North Point Douglas, Lord Selkirk Park and the eastern half of Dufferin to Winnipeg Centre; Gains the Winnipeg neighbourhood of Leila North from Kildonan—St. Paul
Winnipeg South: Loses the Winnipeg neighbourhood of Minnetonka to St. Boniface—St. Vital; Loses the Winnipeg neighbourhoods of Whyte Ridge and Linden Ridge to Winnipeg South Centre. 
Winnipeg South Centre: Gains the Winnipeg neighbourhoods of Whyte Ridge and Linden Ridge from Winnipeg South; loses the Winnipeg neighbourhoods of Tuxedo, Tuxedo South, Old Tuxedo and Edgeland to Winnipeg West. 
Winnipeg West: Replaces Charleswood—St. James—Assiniboia—Headingley. Gains the Winnipeg neighbourhoods of Tuxedo, Tuxedo South, Old Tuxedo and Edgeland from Winnipeg South Centre; Gains the Rural Municipality of St. François Xavier and the Rural Municipality of Cartier from Portage—Lisgar

New Brunswick
On June 16, 2022, the Federal Electoral Boundaries Commission for New Brunswick released their initial proposal, proposing the following ridings:

Acadie—Bathurst: Gains the remainder of the Regional Municipality of Tracadie from Miramichi—Grand Lake
Beauséjour: Loses the remainder of Moncton to Moncton—Dieppe
Fredericton—Oromocto: Replaces Fredericton. Border with Tobique—Mactaquac rerouted to follow the northern border of the City of Fredericton (2023 borders); loses the remainder of the Parishes of Maugerville, Sheffield and Canning to Miramichi—Grand Lake; loses Burton Parish to Saint John—St. Croix
Fundy Royal—Riverview: Replaces Fundy Royal. Gains the remainder of the Town of Riverview from Moncton—Riverview—Dieppe; loses Waterborough to Miramichi—Grand Lake; loses Quispamsis to Saint John—Kennebecasis
Madawaska—Restigouche: Gains the parishes of Drummond and Grand Falls and the municipalities of Saint-André, Grand Falls and Drummond from  Tobique—Mactaquac. Boundary with Miramichi—Grand Lake rerouted around Mount Carleton Provincial Park and the Nepisiguit Protected Natural Area
Miramichi—Grand Lake: Boundary with Madawaska—Restigouche rerouted around Mount Carleton Provincial Park and the Nepisiguit Protected Natural Area; loses the remainder of the Regional Municipality of Tracadie from Acadie—Bathurst; gains the remainder of the Parishes of Maugerville, Sheffield and Canning from Fredericton; gains Waterborough from Fundy Royal
Moncton—Dieppe: Replaces Moncton—Riverview—Dieppe. Loses the remainder of the Town of Riverview to Fundy Royal—Riverview; gains the remainder of Moncton from Beauséjour.
Saint John—Kennebecasis: New riding, consists of that part of the riding of Saint John—Rothesay east of the St. John River, plus the Town of Quispamsis. 
Saint John—St. Croix: New riding, largely replacing New Brunswick Southwest. Gains the City of Saint John west of the St. John River from Saint John—Rothesay; gains Burton from Fredericton; loses the Parishes of McAdam, Dumfries, Prince William, Manners Sutton, Kingsclear, and the municipalities of Hanwell, McAdam, Harvey and the Indian Reserve of Kingsclear 6 to Tobique—Mactaquac
Tobique—Mactaquac: Gains the Parishes of McAdam, Dumfries, Prince William, Manners Sutton, Kingsclear, and the municipalities of Hanwell, McAdam, Harvey and the Indian Reserve of Kingsclear 6 from New Brunswick Southwest; border with Fredericton—Oromocto (replacing Fredericton) rerouted to follow the northern border of the City of Fredericton (2023 borders); loses the parishes of Drummond and Grand Falls and the municipalities of Saint-André, Grand Falls and Drummond to Madawaska—Restigouche

Newfoundland and Labrador
On June 28, 2022, the Federal Electoral Boundaries Commission for Newfoundland and Labrador released their initial proposal, proposing the following ridings:

Avalon: Loses the communities of Victoria, Carbonear, Harbour Grace, Bryant's Cove, Upper Island Cove and Spaniard's Bay to Terra Nova—The Peninsulas. Gains the remainder of Paradise from St. John's East. Gains that part of St. John's west of Highway 1 from St. John's South—Mount Pearl.
Cape Spear: Replaces St. John's South—Mount Pearl. Loses that part of St. John's west of Highway 1 to Avalon. Loses the remainder of St. John's Harbour to St. John's East. 
Labrador: No changes
Long Range Mountains: Gains the communities of Galeville, Georges Cove and The Beaches from Coast of Bays—Central—Notre Dame. 
Notre Dame—Bay d'Espoir: Replaces Coast of Bays—Central—Notre Dame. Loses the communities of Galeville, Georges Cove and The Beaches to Long Range Mountains. Gains the communities of Carmanville, Musgrave Harbour, Lumsden, New-Wes-Valley, Greenspond, Indian Bay and Centreville-Wareham-Trinity from Bonavista—Burin—Trinity.
St. John's East: Loses the remainder of Paradise to Avalon. Gains the remainder of St. John's Harbour from St. John's South—Mount Pearl. 
Terra Nova—The Peninsulas: Replaces Bonavista—Burin—Trinity. Loses the communities of Carmanville, Musgrave Harbour, Lumsden, New-Wes-Valley, Greenspond, Indian Bay and Centreville-Wareham-Trinity to Coast of Bays—Central—Notre Dame. Gains the communities of Victoria, Carbonear, Harbour Grace, Bryant's Cove, Upper Island Cove and Spaniard's Bay from Avalon.

Nova Scotia
On April 27, 2022, the Federal Electoral Boundaries Commission for Nova Scotia released their initial proposal, proposing the following ridings:

Acadian Shore—Shelburne: Replaces West Nova. Loses some territory (Berwick area) in Kings County to Kings—Hants; gains Shelburne County from South Shore—St. Margarets.
Cape Breton—Antigonish: Replaces Cape Breton—Canso, gains remainder of Antigonish County from Central Nova.
Cumberland—Colchester: No boundary changes proposed.
Dartmouth—Cole Harbour: Gains the Eastern Passage area from Sackville—Preston—Chezzetcook; loses all of the area north of Highways 111 and 7 to Shubenacadie—Bedford Basin.
Halifax: Loses the southern rural part of the riding to South Shore—St. Margarets and the Fairmount area to Halifax West.
Halifax West: Gains Fairmount area from Halifax; Loses Parkdale, Lakeside and Beechville communities to South Shore—St. Margarets; Loses Hammonds Plains area and northern part of Bedford to Shubenacadie—Bedford Basin.
Kings—Hants: Gains some territory in Kings County (Berwick area) from West Nova; loses Lantz area to Pictou—Eastern Shore—Preston.
Pictou—Eastern Shore—Preston: Replaces Central Nova. Loses remainder of Antigonish County to Cape Breton—Antigonish; gains Lantz area from Kings—Hants; gains Preston, Chezzetcook and Lawrencetown areas from Sackville—Preston—Chezzetcook.
Shubenacadie—Bedford Basin. Replaces Sackville—Preston—Chezzetcook. Gains Hammonds Plains and northern part of Bedford from Halifax West; Loses Preston, Chezzetcook and Lawrencetown areas to Pictou—Eastern Shore—Preston.
South Shore—St. Margarets: Loses Shelburne County to Acadian Shore—Shelburne; Parkdale, Lakeside and Beechville communities from Halifax West; gains remainder of the rural part of the Chebucto Peninsula from Halifax. 
Sydney—Victoria: No boundary changes proposed.

Ontario
On August 19, 2022, the Federal Electoral Boundaries Commission for Ontario released their initial proposal, proposing the following ridings:

 Ajax: No boundary changes proposed.
 Algonquin—Renfrew—Pembroke: Largely Replaces Renfrew—Nipissing—Pembroke
 Aurora—Oak Ridges—Richmond Hill
 Barrie—Innisfil: No boundary changes proposed.
 Barrie—Springwater—Oro-Medonte
 Bay of Quinte: No boundary changes proposed.
 Bayview—Finch: Largely replaces Willowdale 
 Black Creek: Largely replaces Humber River—Black Creek
 Bowmanville—Oshawa North: Contains all of Durham south of Highway 407 and east of Oshawa Creek.
 Brampton Centre: Re-oriented to a more central location within Brampton compared to its current location in the south-central part of the city. 
 Brampton—Chinguacousy: Largely replaces Brampton North.
 Brampton—Mayfield West: New riding carved from Dufferin—Caledon, Brampton North and Brampton West.
 Brampton North: Largely replaces Brampton East. Shares no territory with the current riding of Brampton North.
 Brampton Southeast: New riding carved from parts of Brampton South, Brampton Centre and Brampton East
 Brampton Southwest: Largely replaces Brampton West
 Brantford: Largely replaces Brantford—Brant
 Bruce—Grey—Owen Sound
 Burlington Lakeshore: Largely replaces Burlington
 Burlington—Milton West: Largely replaces Milton
 Cambridge
 Carleton
 Chatham-Kent—Leamington—Kingsville: Largely replaces Chatham-Kent—Leamington
 Cochrane—Timmins—Timiskaming: Largely replaces Timmins—James Bay
 Collingwood—Blue Mountains: Largely replaces Simcoe—Grey
 Davenport
 Don Valley East
 Don Valley North
 Don Valley West
 Dufferin—Caledon
 Eglinton—Lawrence
 Elgin—Middlesex—Thames: New riding carved from Lambton—Kent—Middlesex and Elgin—Middlesex—London
 Essex
 Etobicoke Centre
 Etobicoke—Lakeshore
 Etobicoke North 
 Flamborough—Glanbrook
 Gananoque—Brockville—Prescott: Largely replaces Leeds—Grenville—Thousand Islands and Rideau Lakes
 Georgetown—Milton East: New riding carved out of Wellington—Halton Hills, Milton and Oakville North—Burlington. 
 Guelph
 Haldimand—Norfolk—Six Nations: Largely replaces Haldimand—Norfolk
 Haliburton—Kawartha Lakes—Brock
 Hamilton Centre
 Hamilton Mountain
 Hamilton—Stoney Creek—Grimsby Lakeshore: Largely replaces Hamilton East—Stoney Creek
 Hamilton West—Ancaster—Dundas
 Hastings—Lennox and Addington—Tyendinaga: Largely replaces Hastings—Lennox and Addington 
 Humber: Largely replaces York South—Weston
 Kanata: Largely replaces Kanata—Carleton
 Kenora—Thunder Bay—Rainy River: Largely replaces Thunder Bay—Rainy River
 Kiiwetinoong—Mushkegowuk: New riding carved out of Kenora, Timmins—James Bay, Thunder Bay—Superior North and a small part of Thunder Bay—Rainy River. Located in the far north of Ontario, the riding is a "special consideration" riding with small population due to its geographic size, isolated character, and the majority of its population being Indigenous. 
 King—Vaughan
 Kingston and the Islands: No boundary changes proposed.
 Kitchener Centre
 Kitchener—Conestoga
 Kitchener South—North Dumfries: Largely replaces Kitchener South—Hespeler
 Lake Simcoe—Uxbridge: New riding carved out of York—Simcoe, Markham—Stouffville, Pickering—Uxbridge and Durham, 72% within York Region. 
 Lanark—Frontenac: Largely replaces Lanark—Frontenac—Kingston
 London Centre: Largely replaces London North Centre
 London Northeast: Largely replaces London—Fanshawe
 London South—St. Thomas: New riding carved out of parts of London—Fanshawe and Elgin—Middlesex—London 
 London West
 Manitoulin—Nickel Belt: Combines parts of Nickel Belt with parts of Algoma—Manitoulin—Kapuskasing.
 Markham—Stouffville
 Markham—Thornhill
 Markham—Unionville
 Mississauga Centre
 Mississauga East—Cooksville
 Mississauga—Erin Mills
 Mississauga—Lakeshore
 Mississauga—Malton
 Mississauga—Meadowvale: Largely replaces Mississauga—Streetsville
 Nepean
 New Tecumseth—Bradford: new riding carved out of parts of Simcoe—Grey, York—Simcoe and King—Vaughan, 73% within Simcoe County giving it a fifth riding.
 Newmarket—Aurora
 Niagara Falls
 Niagara South: Largely replaces Niagara Centre
 Niagara West
 Nipissing: Largely replaces Nipissing—Timiskaming
 Northumberland: Largely replaces Northumberland—Peterborough South
 Oakville Lakeshore: Largely replaces Oakville
 Oakville North: Largely replaces Oakville North—Burlington
 Orléans
 Oshawa
 Ottawa Centre
 Ottawa South
 Ottawa—Vanier
 Ottawa West—Nepean
 Oxford—Brant: Largely replaces Oxford
 Parry Sound—Muskoka
 Penetanguishene—Couchiching: Largely replaces Simcoe North
 Perth—Wellington
 Peterborough: Largely replaces Peterborough—Kawartha
 Pickering—Brooklin: Largely replaces Pickering—Uxbridge
 Prescott—Russell: Largely replaces Glengarry—Prescott—Russell
 Richmond Hill South: Largely replaces Richmond Hill
 Sarnia—Lambton—Bkejwanong: Largely replaces Sarnia—Lambton
 Sault Ste. Marie
 Scarborough Centre
 Scarborough—Guildwood
 Scarborough Northwest: Largely replaces Scarborough North and Scarborough—Agincourt
 Scarborough—Rouge Park
 Scarborough Southwest
 South Huron Shores: Largely replaces Huron—Bruce
 Spadina—Harbourfront: Largely replaces Spadina—Fort York
 St. Catharines 
 St. Clair—Mount Pleasant: Largely replaces Toronto—St. Paul's
 Stormont—Dundas—Glengarry: Largely replaces Stormont—Dundas—South Glengarry
 Sudbury
 Taiaiako'n—High Park: Largely replaces Parkdale—High Park
 The Beaches—East York: Largely replaces Beaches—East York
 Thunder Bay—Superior North
 Toronto Centre
 Toronto—Danforth
 University—Rosedale
 Vaughan—Thornhill: Largely replaces Thornhill
 Vaughan—Woodbridge
 Waterloo
 Wellington—Halton: Largely replaces Wellington—Halton Hills
 Whitby
 Windsor—Tecumseh
 Windsor West
 York Centre

Prince Edward Island
On May 2, 2022, the Federal Electoral Boundaries Commission for Prince Edward Island released their initial proposal, proposing the following ridings:

Cardigan: Loses all of its territory in North Shore and the North Shore Fire District, plus everything west of Highway 6 between them to Malpeque.
Charlottetown: No boundary changes proposed.
Egmont: Gains the Bedeque area plus some areas east and southeast of Summerside from Malpeque.
Malpeque: Gains the remainder of North Shore and the North Shore Fire District, plus everything west of Highway 6 between them from Cardigan; Loses the Bedeque area plus some areas east and southeast of Summerside from Malpeque.

Quebec 
On July 29, 2022, the Federal Electoral Boundaries Commission for Quebec released their initial proposal, proposing the following ridings:

 Abitibi—Baie–James—Nunavik—Eeyou: No boundary changes proposed.
 Abitibi—Témiscamingue: No boundary changes proposed.
 Ahuntsic-Cartierville
 Alfred-Pellan
 Argenteuil—La Petite-Nation
 Beauce: No boundary changes proposed.
 Beauport—Limoilou
 Bécancour—Nicolet—Saurel—Odanak: largely replaces Bécancour—Nicolet—Saurel
 Bellechasse—Les Etchemins—Lévis
 Beloeil—Chambly
 Berthier—Maskinongé
 Bourassa: No boundary changes proposed.
 Brome—Missisquoi: No boundary changes proposed.
 Brossard—Saint-Lambert: No boundary changes proposed.
 Charlesbourg—Haute–Saint–Charles
 Châteauguay—Les Jardins-de-Napierville: largely replaces Châteauguay—Lacolle
 Chicoutimi—Le Fjord
 Compton—Stanstead
 Côte-de-Beaupré—Île d'Orléans—Charlevoix: largely replaces Beauport—Côte-de-Beaupré—Île d'Orléans—Charlevoix
 Dorval—Lachine—LaSalle
 Drummond
 Gaspésie–Les Îles-de-la-Madeleine–Listuguj: largely replaces Gaspésie—Les Îles-de-la-Madeleine
 Gatineau
 Hochelaga
 Honoré-Mercier
 Hull—Aylmer
 Joliette—Manawan: largely replaces Joliette
 Jonquière
 La Pointe-de-l'Île: No boundary changes proposed.
 La Prairie—Atateken: replaces La Prairie
 Lac-Saint-Jean
 Lac-Saint-Louis: No boundary changes proposed.
 LaSalle—Émard—Verdun
 Laurentides—Labelle
 Laurier—Sainte-Marie
 Laval—Les Îles
 Les Pays-d'en-Haut: new district
 Lévis—Lotbinière
 Longueuil—Charles-LeMoyne: No boundary changes proposed.
 Longueuil—Saint-Hubert
 Louis-Hébert
 Louis-Saint-Laurent
 Manicouagan—Kawawachikamach—Uapishka: renamed from Manicouagan; no boundary changes proposed.
 Marc-Aurèle-Fortin
 Mégantic–L'Érable
 Mirabel
 Mont-Royal
 Montarville
 Montcalm
 Montmagny—Témiscouata—Kataskomiq: largely replaces Montmagny—L'Islet—Kamouraska—Rivière-du-Loup
 Notre-Dame-de-Grâce—Westmount
 Outremont
 Papineau: No boundary changes proposed.
 Pierre-Boucher—Les Patriotes—Verchères
 Pierrefonds—Dollard: No boundary changes proposed.
 Pontiac—Kitigan Zibi: largely replaces Pontiac
 Portneuf—Jacques-Cartier
 Québec
 Repentigny
 Richmond—Arthabaska
 Rimouski—Matane: replaces about half of Rimouski-Neigette—Témiscouata—Les Basques
 Rivière-des-Mille-Îles
 Rivière-du-Nord
 Rosemont—La Petite-Patrie: No boundary changes proposed.
 Saint-Hyacinthe—Bagot
 Saint-Jean: No boundary changes proposed.
 Saint-Laurent
 Saint-Léonard—Saint-Michel
 Saint-Maurice—Champlain: No boundary changes proposed.
 Salaberry—Suroît—Soulanges: largely replaces Salaberry—Suroît
 Shefford
 Sherbrooke
 Terrebonne
 Thérèse-De Blainville
 Trois-Rivières: No boundary changes proposed.
 Vaudreuil: largely replaces Vaudreuil—Soulanges
 Ville-Marie—Le Sud-Ouest—Île-des-Sœurs
 Vimy

Saskatchewan
On May 9, 2022, the Federal Electoral Boundaries Commission for Saskatchewan released their initial proposal, proposing the following ridings:

Desnethé—Missinippi—Churchill River: Loses Beaver River, Loon Lake, Medstead, Big River, Spiritwood, Canwood, Shellbrook, Lakeland, Paddockwood, Torch River and Hudson Bay rural municipalities and Prince Albert National Park. 
Battlefords—Lloydminster: Gains Beaver River, Loon Lake, Medstead, Spiritwood, Big River and the western half of Canwood rural municipality; Loses Heart's Hill, Progress, Mairposa, Grandview, Antelope Park, Prairiedale, Oakdale and Winslow rural municipalities. 
Prince Albert: Gains eastern half of Canwood, and Shellbrook, Lakeland, Paddockwood and Torch River rural municipalities, Prince Albert National Park, and Duck Lake rural municipality east of Highway 11; Loses Moose Range and Aborfield rural municipalities.
Saskatoon—Wanuskewin: Successor riding of Carlton Trail—Eagle Creek. Loses territory southwest of Saskatoon, Duck Lake rural municipality east of Highway 11; gains Lake Lenore rural municipality, Humboldt Lake area, and the Silverwood Heights and Lawson Heights neighbourhoods of Saskatoon. 
Saskatoon Centre: New riding located in the core of Saskatoon, encircled by Circle Drive except for the University of Saskatchewan. 
Saskatoon—University: Loses Nutana, Varsity View, Grosvenor Park, Greystone Heights, Richmond Heights, North Park, Silverwood Heights and Lawson Heights neighbourhoods of Saskatoon; gains College Park East, Wildwood, Briarwood and Rosewood neighbourhoods. 
Saskatoon—Grasswood: Vastly changes from its current iteration; gains all of area west of Circle Drive West and south of Graypool Drive from Saskatoon West; loses area north of Highway 11 and west of Circle Drive East to new riding of Saskatoon Centre; Loses College Park East, Wildwood, Briarwood and Rosewood neighbourhoods to Saskatoon—University; gains area of Corman Park rural municipality from Carlton Trail—Eagle Creek.
Kindersley—Rosetown: New riding stretching from the Alberta border in the west, to the Quill Lakes in the east, from Saskatoon in the north to Regina in the south. 
Regina—Qu'Appelle: Loses the rural municipalities of Big Quill, Elfros, Mount Hope, Emerald, Touchwood, Kellross, Ituna Bon Accord, Tullymet and Stanley; gains Lakeridge, Walsh Acres, Normanview and Regent Park neighbourhoods; loses area around Mosaic Stadium. 
Regina—Lewvan: Lakeridge, Walsh Acres, Normanview and Regent Park neighbourhoods; gains Downtown Regina area and area around Mosaic Stadium. 
Regina—Wascana: Loses Downtown Regina area, and rural areas in Sherwood Park rural municipality. 
Yorkton—Melville: Gains rural municipalities of Moose Range, Aborfield, Hudson Bay, Elfros, Emerald, Touchwood, Kellross, Ituna Bon Accord, Tullymet and Stanley; loses rural municipality of Lakeside 
Moose Jaw—Swift Current—Grasslands: Largely made up of Cypress Hills—Grasslands south of the South Saskatchewan River (except for the Stonehenge, Lake of the Rivers, Old Post, Willow Bunch, Poplar Valley, Maple Bush and Enfield rural municipalities), plus the city of Moose Jaw, and the rural municipalities of Moose Jaw, Baildon and Terrell. 
Souris—Moose Mountain: Gains rural municipalities of Stonehenge, Lake of the Rivers, Old Post, Willow Bunch, Poplar Valley, Pense, Sherwood, Redburn, Bratt's Lake, Elmsthorpe and Caledonia.

Public hearings 
The publication of the initial proposals by each of the Boundary Commissions was followed by 150 virtual and in person public hearings.

Final report

Alberta
On February 2, 2023, the Federal Electoral Boundaries Commission for Alberta released their final report, submitting to the House of Commons the following ridings:
Airdrie—Cochrane: Carved out of Banff—Airdrie. Consists of Airdie, Cochrane and the central part of Rocky View County.
Battle River—Crowfoot: Gains the remainder of Kneehill County, including the villages of Linden, Acme and Carbon from Bow River; Loses all of its territory in Leduc County to Leduc—Wetaskiwin.
Bow River: Loses all of its territory in Kneehill County, including the villages of Linden, Acme and Carbon to Battle River—Crowfoot; Loses all of its territory west of Highways 23 and Highway 24 in Vulcan County, including all of the Town of Vulcan to Foothills; Gains a bit of area in Rocky View County east of Airdrie from Banff—Airdrie.
Calgary Centre: Loses the neighbourhoods of Lincoln Park, Rutland Park, CFB Currie and that part of Richmond west of Crowchild Trail and south of Richmond Road and all of its territory in Shaganappi and Rosscarrock to Calgary Signal Hill.
Calgary Confederation: Loses the neighbourhoods of Dalhousie, Highland Park, Highwood, Queens Park Village and Greemview to Calgary Nose Hill; Gains the neighbourhoods of Bowness and Greenwood/Greenbriar from Calgary Signal Hill.
Calgary Crowfoot: Largeley replaces Calgary Rocky Ridge. Loses the neighbourhood of Kincora to Calgary Nose Hill, and the neighbourhoods of Evanston and Sage Hill east of Symons Valley Rd to Calgary Skyview. 
Calgary East: New riding created out of Calgary Forest Lawn south of 16 Ave NE plus part of Vista Heights; and that part of Calgary Shepard north of a line following 130 Ave SE to 52 St SE to Glenmore Trail. 
Calgary Heritage: Loses the neighbourhood of Kingsland to Calgary Midnapore; Gains the neighbourhoods of Millrise and Shawnessy from Calgary Midnapore.
Calgary McKnight: New riding created out of Calgary Forest Lawn north of 16 Ave NE excluding part of Vista Heights; and that part of Calgary Skyview south of a line following Deerfoot Trail NE to Country Hills Blvd. NE to Metis Trail NE to 96 Ave NE to 68 St NE to 80 Ave NE. 
Calgary Midnapore: Gains the neighbourhood of Kingsland from Calgary Heritage; Loses the neighbourhoods of Millrise and Shawnessy to Calgary Heritage.
Calgary Nose Hill: Gains the neighbourhoods of Dalhousie, Highland Park, Highwood, Queens Park Village and Greemview from Calgary Confederation; Gains the neighbourhood of Kincora from Calgary Rocky Ridge; Loses the neighbourhood of Panorama Hills to Calgary Skyview; Gains the neighbourhood of Havest Hills from Calgary Skyview. 
Calgary Shepard: Loses all of its territory north of a line following 130 Ave SE to 52 St SE to Glenmore Trail to Calgary East. 
Calgary Signal Hill: Gains the neighbourhoods of Lincoln Park, Rutland Park, CFB Currie, Shaganappi, Rosscarrock and that part of Richmond west of Crowchild Trail and south of Richmond Road from Calgary Centre; Loses the neighbourhoods of Bowness and Greenwood/Greenbriar to Calgary Confederation. 
Calgary Skyview: Loses all of its territory south of a line following Deerfoot Trail NE to Country Hills Blvd. NE to Metis Trail NE to 96 Ave NE to 68 St NE to 80 Ave NE to Calgary McKnight; Loses the neighbourhood of Havest Hills to Calgary Nose Hill; Gains the neighbourhood of Panorama Hills from Calgary Nose Hill; Gains  the neighbourhoods of Evanston and Sage Hill east of Symons Valley Rd from Calgary Rocky Ridge. 
Edmonton Centre: Gains the neighbourhoods of Athlone, Kensington and Calder from Edmonton Griesbach; Loses the remainder of the neighbourhood of McCauley to Edmonton Griesbach; Loses all of its territory south of the Mackenzie Ravine to 95 Ave to Edmonton West; Gains the neighbourhoods of Glenwood, Britannia Youngstown and Mayfield from Edmonton West. 
Edmonton Gateway: New riding; Consists of Edmonton Mill Woods west of 66 St (except for the area north of 34 Ave and west of 99 St); Edmonton Riverbend east of 111 St (except the neighbourhood of Twin Brooks); and the neighbourhoods of Rutherford, Blackmud Creek, Cashman, Cavanagh, Callaghan, Allard, Desrochers, Ellerslie, Summerside, The Orchards at Ellerslie, and the southern half of Walker from Edmonton—Wetaskiwin.
Edmonton Griesbach: Gains the neighbourhoods of Eaux Claires, Belle Rive and Mayliewan from Edmonton Manning; Gains the neighbourhood of Riverdale from Edmonton Strathcona; Gains the remainder of McCauley from Edmonton Centre; Loses the neighbourhoods of Athlone, Kensington and Calder to Edmonton Centre; Loses the neighbourhood of Wellington to Edmonton Northwest. 
Edmonton Manning: Loses the neighbourhoods of Lorelei and Beaumaris to Edmonton Northwest; Loses the neighbourhoods of Eaux Claires, Belle Rive and Mayliewan to Edmonton Griesbach. 
Edmonton Northwest: New riding, consisting mostly of the Edmonton portions of St. Albert—Edmonton, plus the neighbourhoods of Lorelei and Beaumaris from Edmonton Manning; Wellington from Edmonton Griesbach; and that part of Edmonton West north of a line following Whitemud Dr to Anthony Henday Dr to 87 Av to 178 St to 95 Av, to 170 St to Mayfield Rd to 111 Av. 
Edmonton Riverbend: Loses the neighbourhoods of Aspen Gardens, Royal Gardens, Rideau Park and Duggan to Edmonton Strathcona; Loses the area east of 111 St (except the neighbourhood of Twin Brooks) to Edmonton Gateway; Gains the neighbourhoods of Kewsiwck, the remainder of Ambleside, Glenridding Heights, Glenridding Ravine, Hays Ridge, Graydon Hill, Paisley, and Chappelle and everything in Edmonton south of those neighbourhoods and west of the Queen Elizabeth Highway in Edmonton—Wetaskiwin; Loses the neighbourhood of Windermere to Edmonton West.   
Edmonton Southeast: Largely replaces Edmonton Mill Woods. Loses the area west of 66 St to Edmonton Gateway (except for the area north of 34 Ave and west of 99 St which is being transferred to Edmonton Strathcona); Gains the neighbourhoods of Charlesworth and the northern half of Walker plus the rural south-eastern part of the city from Edmonton—Wetaskiwin. 
Edmonton Strathcona: Loses the neighbourhood of Riverdale to Edmonton Griesbach; Gains the neighbourhoods of Aspen Gardens, Royal Gardens, Rideau Park and Duggan from Edmonton Riverbend; Gains the area north of 34 Ave and west of 99 St from Edmonton Mill Woods. 
Edmonton West: Gains the neighbourhood of Windermere from Edmonton Riverbend; Loses the area north of a line following Whitemud Dr to Anthony Henday Dr to 87 Av to 178 St to 95 Av, to 170 St to Mayfield Rd to 111 Av. to Edmonton Northwest; Loses the neighbourhoods of Glenwood, Britannia Youngstown and Mayfield to Edmonton Centre; Gains all of Edmonton Centre south of the Mackenzie Ravine to 95 Ave. 
Foothills: Loses remainder of Kananaskis and Rocky View County (except Bragg Creek area) to Jasper—Banff—Canmore; Gains territory west of Highways 23 and Highway 24 in Vulcan County, including all of the Town of Vulcan from Bow River; Gains Blood 148 and Blood 148A Indian Reserves plus the remainder of Improvement District No. 4 Waterton from Medicine Hat—Cardston—Warner.
Fort McMurray—Cold Lake: Gains area north of Highway 659 and east of Durlingville from Lakeland. 
Grande Prairie: Replaces Grande Prairie—Mackenzie. Loses its territory east of the Smoky River and its north-eastern pan-handle generally east of Hay River to Peace River—Westlock.
Jasper—Banff—Canmore: New district based along the Rocky Mountains. Contains Jasper, Edson, Hinton, Rocky Mountain House, Caroline, Sundre, Cremona, Carstairs, Crossfield, Canmore and Banff.
Lakeland: Loses area north of Highway 659 and east of Durlingville to Fort McMurray—Cold Lake
Leduc—Wetaskiwin: New district mostly containing the non-Edmonton parts of Edmonton—Wetaskiwin, but contains all of Leduc County (including Warburg and Thorsby), and all of the Indian Reserves between Wetaskiwin and Ponoka. 
Lethbridge: No change 
Medicine Hat—Cardston—Warner: Loses Blood 148 and Blood 148A Indian Reserves plus the remainder of Improvement District No. 4 Waterton to Foothills. 
Parkland: New district based in the western exurbs of Edmonton. Includes all of Parkland County including Spruce Grove, Stony Plain, Spring Lake; Brazeau County including Drayton Valley and Breton; the eastern part of Yellowhead County around Chip Lake and the part of Lac Ste. Anne County around Mayerthorpe.
Peace River—Westlock: Gains the territory east of the Smoky River and the north-eastern pan-handle generally east of Hay River from Grande Prairie—Mackenzie.
Ponoka—Didsbury: New district created from much of the rural areas of the two Red Deer based ridings. Contains Ponoka County, Lacombe County, and the municipalities they surround, the western half of Red Deer County including Innisfail and Bowden and the northeastern half of Mountain View County including Olds and Didsbury. 
Red Deer: New district. Contains Red Deer and the eastern half of Red Deer County including Penhold, Delburne and Elnora. 
Sherwood Park—Fort Saskatchewan: No change.
St. Albert—Sturgeon River: New district. Contains St. Albert, Sturgeon County and the municipalities it surrounds, and most of Lac Ste. Anne County and the municipalities it surrounds except for the Mayerthorpe area.

British Columbia
On February 8, 2023, the Federal Electoral Boundaries Commission for British Columbia released their final report, submitting to the House of Commons the following ridings:
Abbotsford—South Langley
Burnaby Central
Burnaby North—Seymour
Capilano—North Vancouver
Cariboo—Prince George
Chilliwack—Hope
Cloverdale—Langley City
Columbia—Kootenay—Southern Rockies
Coquitlam—Port Coquitlam
Courtenay—Alberni
Cowichan—Malahat—Langford
Delta
Esquimalt—Saanich—Sooke
Fleetwood—Port Kells
Howe Sound—West Vancouver
Kamloops—Shuswap—Central Rockies
Kamloops—Thompson—Nicola
Kelowna
Langley Township
Mission—Matsqui—Abbotsford
Nanaimo—Ladysmith
New Westminster—Burnaby—Maillardville
North Island—Powell River
Okanagan Lake West—South Kelowna
Pitt Meadows—Maple Ridge
Port Moody—Coquitlam
Prince George—Peace River—Northern Rockies
Richmond Centre—Marpole
Richmond East—Steveston
Saanich—Gulf Islands
Similkameen—West Kootenay
Skeena—Bulkley Valley
South Surrey—White Rock
Surrey Centre
Surrey Newton
Vancouver Arbutus
Vancouver Centre
Vancouver East
Vancouver Fraserview—South Burnaby
Vancouver Kingsway
Vancouver West Broadway
Vernon—Monashee
Victoria

New Brunswick
On November 30, 2022, the Federal Electoral Boundaries Commission for New Brunswick released their final report, submitting to the House of Commons the following ridings:

Acadie—Bathurst: Gains the remainder of the Regional Municipality of Tracadie from Miramichi—Grand Lake
Beauséjour: Loses the remainder of Moncton to Moncton—Dieppe.
Fredericton—Oromocto: Replaces Fredericton. Border with Tobique—Mactaquac rerouted to follow the northern border of the City of Fredericton (2023 borders); loses the remainder of the Parishes of Maugerville, Sheffield and Canning to Miramichi—Grand Lake; loses Burton Parish to Saint John—St. Croix, except for those parts of the parish that will be transferred to the Town of Oromocto in 2023. 
Fundy Royal: Gains the remainder of the Town of Riverview from Moncton—Riverview—Dieppe; loses Waterborough to Miramichi—Grand Lake; loses Quispamsis to Saint John—Kennebecasis
Madawaska—Restigouche: Gains the parishes of Drummond and the northern half of Grand Falls and the municipalities of Saint-André, Grand Falls and Drummond from  Tobique—Mactaquac. Boundary with Miramichi—Grand Lake rerouted around Mount Carleton Provincial Park and the Nepisiguit Protected Natural Area
Miramichi—Grand Lake: Boundary with Madawaska—Restigouche rerouted around Mount Carleton Provincial Park and the Nepisiguit Protected Natural Area; loses the remainder of the Regional Municipality of Tracadie to Acadie—Bathurst; gains the remainder of the Parishes of Maugerville, Sheffield and Canning from Fredericton; gains Waterborough from Fundy Royal
Moncton—Dieppe: Replaces Moncton—Riverview—Dieppe. Loses the remainder of the Town of Riverview to Fundy Royal; gains the remainder of the City of Moncton from Beauséjour and Fundy Royal (2023 borders).
Saint John—Kennebecasis: New riding, consists of the City of Saint John east of the St. John River, plus the Towns of Quispamsis and Rothesay (2023 borders). 
Saint John—St. Croix: New riding, largely replacing New Brunswick Southwest. Gains the City of Saint John west of the St. John River from Saint John—Rothesay; gains Burton from Fredericton; loses the Parishes of Dumfries, Prince William, Manners Sutton, Kingsclear, and the municipalities of Hanwell, and Harvey and the Indian Reserve of Kingsclear 6 to Tobique—Mactaquac
Tobique—Mactaquac: Gains the Parishes of Dumfries, Prince William, Manners Sutton, and Kingsclear, and the municipalities of Hanwell, and Harvey and the Indian Reserve of Kingsclear 6 from New Brunswick Southwest; border with Fredericton—Oromocto (replacing Fredericton) rerouted to follow the northern border of the City of Fredericton (2023 borders); loses the parishes of Drummond and Grand Falls and the municipalities of Saint-André, Grand Falls and Drummond to Madawaska—Restigouche

Newfoundland and Labrador
On December 7, 2022, the Federal Electoral Boundaries Commission for Newfoundland and Labrador released their final report, submitting to the House of Commons the following ridings:

Avalon: Loses the eastern shore of Placentia Bay to Terra Nova—The Peninsulas; Gains Salmon Cove from Bonavista—Burin—Trinity; Loses the remainder of Paradise to Cape Spear; Gains Witless Bay, Bay Bulls and the Southlands and Goulds areas of St. John's from St. John's South—Mount Pearl. 
Cape Spear: Largely replaces St. John's South—Mount Pearl; Gains Paradise from Avalon and St. John's East; Loses Witless Bay, Bay Bulls and the Southlands and Goulds areas of St. John's  to Avalon; Loses the remainder of St. John's Harbour, the Wishingwell Park area and the Ayre Athletic Field area to St. John's East. 
Central Newfoundland: Replaces Coast of Bays—Central—Notre Dame. Loses the communities of Galeville, Georges Cove and The Beaches to Long Range Mountains.
Labrador: No changes
Long Range Mountains: Gains the communities of Galeville, Georges Cove and The Beaches from Coast of Bays—Central—Notre Dame. 
St. John's East: Loses the remainder of Paradise to Cape Spear; Gains the remainder of St. John's Harbour, the Wishingwell Park area and the Ayre Athletic Field area from St. John's South—Mount Pearl.
Terra Nova—The Peninsulas. Largely replaces Bonavista—Burin—Trinity. Gains the eastern shore of Placentia Bay from Avalon; Loses Salmon Cove to Avalon.

Nova Scotia
On November 17, 2022, the Federal Electoral Boundaries Commission for Nova Scotia released their final report, submitting to the House of Commons the following ridings:

Acadie—Annapolis: Replaces West Nova. Loses some territory (Berwick area) in Kings County to Kings—Hants. 
Cape Breton—Canso—Antigonish: Mostly replaces Cape Breton—Canso. Gains remainder of Antigonish County from Central Nova. Exchanges territory with Sydney—Victoria (gains Victoria, remainder of Inverness and rural western part of the Cape Breton Regional Municipality; loses urban part of the Cape Breton Regional Municipality from Sydney Forks to Morien, including Glace Bay area). 
Cumberland—Colchester (no changes)
Dartmouth—Cole Harbour: Gains the Eastern Passage area from Sackville—Preston—Chezzetcook. Loses all of the area north of Highways 111 and 118 plus the Lake Charles area to Sackville—Bedford—Preston.
Halifax: Loses the Fairmount area to Halifax West
Halifax West: Gains the Fairmount area from Halifax and the Chebucto Peninsula from South Shore—St. Margarets. Loses the Bedford, Hammonds Plains and Lucasville areas to Sackville—Bedford—Preston
Kings—Hants: Gains some territory (Berwick area) in Kings County from West Nova. 
Pictou—Eastern Shore: Replaces Central Nova. Loses the remainder of Antigonish County to Cape Breton—Canso—Antigonish. Gains the Lawrencetown, Porters Lake and Chezzetcook from Sackville—Preston—Chezzetcook.
Sackville—Bedford—Preston: Replaces Sackville—Preston—Chezzetcook. Gains the Bedford, Hammonds Plains and Lucasville areas from Halifax West. Gains the area north of Highways 111 and 118 plus the Lake Charles area from Dartmouth—Cole Harbour. Loses the Lawrencetown, Porters Lake and Chezzetcook areas to Pictou—Eastern Shore.
South Shore—St. Margarets: Loses the Chebucto Peninsula to Halifax West. 
Sydney—Glace Bay: Mostly replaces Sydney—Victoria. Exchanges territory with Cape Breton—Canso (loses Victoria, remainder of Inverness and rural western part of the Cape Breton Regional Municipality; gains urban part of the Cape Breton Regional Municipality from Sydney Forks to Morien, including Glace Bay area).

Ontario
On February 10, 2023, the Federal Electoral Boundaries Commission for Ontario released their final report, submitting to the House of Commons the following ridings:
Ajax
Algonquin—Renfrew—Pembroke
Aurora—Oak Ridges—Richmond Hill
Barrie North—Springwater—Oro-Medonte
Barrie South—Innisfil
Bay of Quinte
Beaches—East York
Bowmanville—Oshawa North
Brampton Centre
Brampton East
Brampton North—Caledon
Brampton South
Brampton West
Brampton—Chinguacousy Park
Brantford—Brant South—Six Nations
Bruce—Grey—Owen Sound
Burlington
Burlington North—Milton West
Cambridge
Carleton
Chatham-Kent—Leamington
Davenport
Don Valley North
Don Valley South
Dufferin—Caledon
Eglinton—Lawrence
Elgin—St. Thomas—London South
Essex
Etobicoke Centre
Etobicoke North
Etobicoke—Lakeshore
Flamborough—Glanbrook—Brant North
Guelph
Haldimand—Norfolk
Haliburton—Kawartha Lakes
Hamilton Centre
Hamilton East—Stoney Creek
Hamilton Mountain
Hamilton West—Ancaster—Dundas
Hastings—Lennox and Addington—Tyendinaga
Humber River—Black Creek
Huron—Bruce
Kanata
Kapuskasing—Timmins—Mushkegowuk
Kenora—Kiiwetinoong
Kingston and the Islands
King—Vaughan
Kitchener Centre
Kitchener South—Hespeler
Kitchener—Conestoga
Lanark—Frontenac
Leeds—Grenville—Thousand Islands—Rideau Lakes
London Centre
London West
London—Fanshawe
Manitoulin—Nickel Belt
Markham—Stouffville
Markham—Thornhill
Markham—Unionville
Middlesex—London
Milton East—Halton Hills South
Mississauga Centre
Mississauga East—Cooksville
Mississauga—Erin Mills
Mississauga—Lakeshore
Mississauga—Malton
Mississauga—Streetsville
Nepean
New Tecumseth—Gwillimbury
Newmarket—Aurora
Niagara North
Niagara South
Niagara West
Nipissing—Timiskaming
Northumberland—Clarke
Oakville East
Oakville West
Orléans
Oshawa
Ottawa Centre
Ottawa South
Ottawa West—Nepean
Ottawa—Vanier—Gloucester
Oxford
Parry Sound—Muskoka
Perth—Wellington
Peterborough
Pickering—Brooklin
Prescott—Russell—Cumberland
Richmond Hill South
Sarnia—Lambton—Bkejwanong
Sault Ste. Marie—Algoma
Scarborough Centre—Don Valley East
Scarborough North
Scarborough Southwest
Scarborough—Agincourt
Scarborough—Guildwood—Rouge Park
Scarborough—Woburn
Simcoe North
Simcoe—Grey
Spadina—Harbourfront
St. Catharines
Stormont—Dundas—Glengarry
Sudbury
Taiaiko'n—Parkdale—High Park
Thunder Bay—Rainy River
Thunder Bay—Superior North
Toronto Centre
Toronto—Danforth
Toronto—St. Paul's
University—Rosedale
Vaughan—Thornhill
Vaughan—Woodbridge
Waterloo
Wellington—Halton Hills North
Whitby
Willowdale
Windsor West
Windsor—Tecumseh
York Centre
York South—Weston—Etobicoke
York—Durham

Prince Edward Island
On November 29, 2022, the Federal Electoral Boundaries Commission for Prince Edward Island released their final report, submitting to the House of Commons the following ridings: The map is nearly identical to the commission's initial proposal, save for a small part of what had been the North Shore Fire District located west of Highway 25 and north of Highway 2 being transferred to Charlottetown. This area was annexed into the City of Charlottetown in June 2022.

Cardigan: Loses all of its territory in North Shore and the North Shore Fire District, plus everything west of Highway 6 between them to Malpeque.
Charlottetown: Gains newly annexed territory by the City of Charlottetown in the Marshfield area from Malpeque. 
Egmont: Gains the Bedeque area plus some areas east and southeast of Summerside from Malpeque.
Malpeque: Gains the remainder of North Shore and the North Shore Fire District, plus everything west of Highway 6 between them from Cardigan; Loses the Bedeque area plus some areas east and southeast of Summerside from Malpeque. Loses newly annexed territory by the City of Charlottetown in the Marshfield area to Charlottetown.

Quebec
On February 1, 2023, the Federal Electoral Boundaries Commission for Quebec released their final report, submitting to the House of Commons the following ridings:

Abitibi—Baie-James—Nunavik—Eeyou: No change
Abitibi—Témiscamingue: No change
Ahuntsic-Cartierville: Loses the territory south of Boul. Acadie and east of Boul. Henri-Bourassa to Saint-Laurent.
Alfred-Pellan: Gains the territory east of Boul. des Laurentides from Vimy
Argenteuil—La Petite-Nation: Loses the municipalities of Wentworth-Nord, Lac-des-Seize-Îles, Wentworth, Saint-Adolphe-d'Howard, Morin-Heights, Mille-Isles and Gore to Les Pays-d'en-Haut; Gains Val-des-Monts from Pontiac; Gains that part of the city of Gatineau north of Autoroute 50; and that part of Gatineau east of Av. du Cheval-Blanc, and south of a line that follows Rivière Blanche to Highway 148 from the riding of Gatineau
Beauce: No change
Beauharnois—Soulanges: Largely replaces Salaberry—Suroît. Gains Les Cèdres and Pointe-des-Cascades from Vaudreuil—Soulanges; Loses the remainder of the Le Haut-Saint-Laurent MRC and both the Town and Township of Hemmingford to Châteauguay—Les Jardins-de-Napierville
Beauport—Limoilou: Gains the remainder of the Chutes-Montmorency neighbourhood from Beauport—Côte-de-Beaupré—Île d'Orléans—Charlevoix; Gains territory from Charlesbourg—Haute-Saint-Charles south of a line that follows Rue de Chamonix, 10e Av. East, and Boul. Louix-XIV; and an additional territory south of a line that follows 41e Rue West, to Boul. Henri-Bourassa to Autoroute 40. 
Bécancour—Saurel—Odanak: Largely replaces Bécancour—Nicolet—Saurel. Gains Leclercville and Val-Alain from Lévis—Lotbinière; Gains Villeroy from Mégantic—L'Érable
Bellechasse—Les Etchemins—Lévis: Loses area west of 4e Av. and Rue St-Eustache in Lévis to Lévis—Lotbinière. 
Beloeil—Chambly: Loses Carignan to Montarville
Berthier—Maskinongé: Gains Saint-Sulpice from Repentigny
Bourassa: No change.
Brome—Missisquoi: No change. 
Brossard—Saint-Lambert: No change. 
Charlesbourg—Haute-Saint-Charles: Gains territory from Louis-Saint-Laurent east of the following line: Boul. Val-Cartier to Rue de la Rivière-Nelson, Rivière Saint-Charles, the eastern limits of the Wendake Indian Reserve, Boul. Bastien, Boul. Pierre-Bertrand; Loses the territory east of Ch. de Château-Bigot and Av. du Bourg-Royal and north of Boul. Louis-XIV to Montmorency—Charlevoix; Loses territory to Beauport—Limoilou south of a line that follows Rue de Chamonix, 10e Av. East, and Boul. Louix-XIV; and an additional territory south of a line that follows 41e Rue West, to Boul. Henri-Bourassa to Autoroute 40. 
Châteauguay—Les Jardins-de-Napierville: Largely replaces Châteauguay—Lacolle. Gains both the Town and Township of Hemmingford, and the municipalities of Très-Saint-Sacrement, Howick, Saint-Chrysotome, Havelock, and Franklin from Salabarry—Suroît. Loses a small piece of territory north of Autoroute 30 in Saint-Isidore and a small piece of territory near Ch. St-Bernard in Châteauguay to La Prairie—Atateken.
Chicoutimi—Le Fjord: Gains the unorganized territories of Lac-Ministuk and Mont-Valin, and the municipalities of Sainte-Rose-du-Nord and Saint-Fulgence, and the remainder of the borough of Chicoutimi from Jonquière.  
Compton—Stanstead: Loses Weedon, Lingwick and Scotstown to Mégantic—L'Érable; Gains the Parc-Belvédère area from Sherbrooke. 
Côte-Nord—Kawawachikamach—Uapashke: New name for Manicouagan. No other changes.
Dorval—Lachine: Replaces Dorval—Lachine—LaSalle. Loses area east of Av. 90e East and south of Rue Airlie to LaSalle—Verdun. 
Drummond: No change. 
Gaspésie—Les Îles-de-la-Madeleine—Listuguj: Replaces Gaspésie—Les Îles-de-la-Madeleine. Gains the entirety of the MRCs of La Matanie and Avignon from Avignon—La Mitis—Matane—Matapédia.
Gatineau: Loses that part of the city of Gatineau north of Autoroute 50; and that part of the City of Gatineau east of Av. du Cheval-Blanc, and south of a line that follows Rivière Blanche to Highway 148 to Argenteuil—La Petite-Nation; Gains the remainder of the City of Gatineau west of Montée Paiement from Pontiac. 
Hochelaga: The boundary with Saint-Léonard—Saint-Michel along Rue Bélanger moved to the borough boundary between Rosemont—La-Petite-Patrie and Saint-Léonard.
Honoré-Mercier: Gains the territory north of Boul. Langelier and west of Rue Bombardier from Saint-Léonard—Saint-Michel. 
Hull—Aylmer: Loses the remainder of the Plateau neighbourhood to Pontiac—Kitigan Zibi. 
Joliette—Manawan: Replaces Joliette. Loses the municipalities of Saint-Donat and Notre-Dame-de-la-Merci to Laurentides—Labelle; Loses Entrelacs and Chertsey to Les Pays-d'en-Haut; Gains the Domaine-Ouellet area from Repentigny.
Jonquière—Alma: Largely replaces Jonquière. Gains the city of Alma from Lac-Saint-Jean; Loses the unorganized territories of Lac-Ministuk and Mont-Valin, and the municipalities of Sainte-Rose-du-Nord and Saint-Fulgence, and its territory in the borough of Chicoutimi to Chicoutimi—Le Fjord; Loses La Marche, Labrecque, Saint-Nazaire, Bégin, Saint-David-de-Falardeau, Saint-Ambroise, Saint-Charles-de-Bourget, and Saint-Honoré to Lac-Saint-Jean.
La Pointe-de-l'Île: No changes. 
La Prairie—Atateken: Replaces La Prairie. Gains a small piece of territory north of Autoroute 30 in Saint-Isidore and a small piece of territory near Ch. St-Bernard in Châteauguay from Châteauguay—Lacolle.  
Lac-Saint-Jean: Loses the city of Alma to Jonquière—Alma; Gains La Marche, Labrecque, Saint-Nazaire, Bégin, Saint-David-de-Falardeau, Saint-Ambroise, Saint-Charles-de-Bourget, and Saint-Honoré from Jonquière—Alma.
Lac-Saint-Louis: No change. 
LaSalle—Verdun: Replaces LaSalle—Émard—Verdun. Gains area east of Av. 90e East and south of Rue Airlie from Dorval—Lachine.
Laurentides—Labelle: Gains the municipalities of Saint-Donat and Notre-Dame-de-la-Merci from Joliette; Loses all of its territory in the MRC of Les Pays-d'en-Haut to the new riding of Les Pays-d'en-Haut.
Laurier—Sainte-Marie: Loses the territory south of Av. Christophe-Colombe and west of Rue Rachel to Outremont; Gains territory north of Boul. Robert-Bourassa and east of Av. Viger (including Saint Helen's Island and Notre Dame Island) from Ville-Marie—Le Sud-Ouest—Île-des-Soeurs.
Laval—Les Îles: No change.
Les Pays-d'en-Haut: New riding. Takes the municipalities of Wentworth-Nord, Lac-des-Seize-Îles, Wentworth, Saint-Adolphe-d'Howard, Morin-Heights, Mille-Isles and Gore from Argenteuil—La Petite-Nation; Takes Saint-Colomban from Mirabel; Takes the municipalities of Sainte-Anne-des-Lacs, Saint-Sauveur, Piedmont, Sainte-Adèle, Sainte-Marguerite-du-Lac-Masson and Estérel from Laurentides—Labelle; Takes Prévost and Saint-Hippolyte from Rivière-du-Nord; Takes Saint-Calixte from Montcalm; Takes Entrelacs and Chertsey from Joliette.
Lévis—Lotbinière: Gains area west of 4e Av. and Rue St-Eustache in Lévis from Bellechasse—Les Etchemins—Lévis; Loses Leclercville and Val-Alain to Bécancour—Saurel—Odanak; Loses the municipalities of Lotbinère, Saint-Croix, Saint-Édouard-de-Lotbinière, Notre-Dame-du-Sacré-Coeur-d'Issoudun, Saint-Janvier-de-Joly, Laurier-Station, Saint-Flavien, Dosquet, and Sainte-Agathe-de-Lotbinière to Mégantic—L'Érable.
Longueuil—Charles-LeMoyne: No change.
Longueuil—Saint-Hubert: No change. 
Louis-Hébert: Loses the area east of Av. Maguire to Québec Centre. 
Louis-Saint-Laurent—Akiawenhrahk: Replaces Louis-Saint-Laurent. Loses territory to Charlesbourg—Haute-Saint-Charles east of the following line: Boul. Val-Cartier to Rue de la Rivière-Nelson, Rivière Saint-Charles, the eastern limits of the Wendake Indian Reserve, Boul. Bastien, Boul. Pierre-Bertrand.
Marc-Aurèle-Fortin: No change
Mégantic—L'Érable: Gains Weedon, Lingwick and Scotstown from Compton—Stanstead; Loses Villeroy to Bécancour—Saurel—Odanak; Gains the municipalities of Lotbinère, Saint-Croix, Saint-Édouard-de-Lotbinière, Notre-Dame-du-Sacré-Coeur-d'Issoudun, Saint-Janvier-de-Joly, Laurier-Station, Saint-Flavien, Dosquet, and Sainte-Agathe-de-Lotbinière from Lévis—Lotbinière.
Mirabel: Loses Saint-Colomban to Les Pays-d'en-Haut; Gains the territory west of Montée Laurin, south of Ch. de la Rivière-Sud and west of Boul. Industriel in Saint-Eustache from Rivière-des-Mille-Îles; Loses Sainte-Anne-des-Plaines to Rivière-du-Nord.
Mount Royal: Gains the territory south of Boul. Décaire and west of Ch. Côte-Saint-Luc from Notre-Dame-de-Grâce—Westmount.
Montarville: Gains Carignan from Beloeil—Chambly.
Montcalm: Loses Saint-Calixte to Les Pays-d'en-Haut.
Montmagny—Témiscouata—Kataskomiq: Largely replaces Montmagny—L'Islet—Kamouraska—Rivière-du-Loup. Gains the MRC of Témiscouata from Rimouski-Neigette—Témiscouata—Les Basques
Montmorency—Charlevoix: Largely replaces Beauport—Côte-de-Beaupré—Île d'Orléans—Charlevoix. Loses the Chutes-Montmorency area to Beauport—Limoilou; Gains the territory east of Ch. de Château-Bigot and Av. du Bourg-Royal and north of Boul. Louis-XIV from Charlesbourg—Haute-Saint-Charles; Gains the municipalities of Lac-Beauport and Sainte-Brigitte-de-Laval from Portneuf—Jacques-Cartier. 
Notre-Dame-de-Grâce—Westmount: Loses the territory south of Boul. Décaire and west of Ch. Côte-Saint-Luc to Mount Royal; Gains the territory west of Rue Notre-Dame and Av. Atwater from Ville-Marie—Le Sud-Ouest—Île-des-Sœurs.
Outremont: Gains the territory south of Av. Christophe-Colombe and west of Rue Rachel from Laurier—Sainte-Marie.
Papineau: No change.
Pierre-Boucher—Les Patriotes—Verchères: No change. 
Pierrefonds—Dollard: No change.
Pontiac—Kitigan Zibi: Replaces Pontiac. Loses Val-des-Monts to Argenteuil—La Petite-Nation; Loses that part of the City of Gatineau west of Montée Paiement to the riding of Gatineau; Gains the rest of the Plateau neighbourhood from Hull—Aylmer. 
Portneuf—Jacques-Cartier: Loses the municipalities of Lac-Beauport and Sainte-Brigitte-de-Laval to Montmorency—Charlevoix.
Québec Centre: Replaces Québec. Gains the area east of Av. Maguire from Louis-Hébert.
Repentigny: Loses the Domaine-Ouellet area to Joliette—Manawan; Loses Saint-Sulpice to Berthier—Maskinongé.
Richmond—Arthabaska: No change. 
Rimouski—La Matapédia: Merger of the Rimouski-Neigette—Témiscouata—Les Basques and Avignon—La Mitis—Matane—Matapédia districts. Takes the MRCs of Les Basuqes and Rimouski-Neigette from Rimouski-Neigette—Témiscouata—Les Basques; takes the MRCs of La Mitis and Matapédia from Avignon—La Mitis—Matane—Matapédia.
Rivière-des-Mille-Îles: Loses the territory west of Montée Laurin, south of Ch. de la Rivière-Sud and west of Boul. Industriel in Saint-Eustache to Mirabel. 
Rivière-du-Nord: Gains Sainte-Anne-des-Plaines from Mirabel; Loses the municipalities of Prévost and Saint-Hippolyte to Les Pays-d'en-Haut.   
Rosemont—La Petite-Patrie: No change. 
Saint-Hyacinthe—Bagot—Acton. New name for Saint-Hyacinthe—Bagot. No other changes. 
Saint-Jean: No change. 
Saint-Laurent: Gains the territory south of Boul. Acadie and east of Boul. Henri-Bourassa from Ahuntsic-Cartierville.
Saint-Léonard—Saint-Michel: Loses the territory north of Boul. Langelier and west of Rue Bombardier to Honoré-Mercier; The boundary with Hochelaga along Rue Bélanger moved to the borough boundary between Rosemont—La-Petite-Patrie and Saint-Léonard.
Saint-Maurice—Champlain
Shefford: No change.
Sherbrooke: Loses the Parc-Belvédère area to Compton—Stanstead. 
Terrebonne: Loses area west of Boul. des Laurentides to Thérèse-De Blainville.
Thérèse-De Blainville: Gains area west of Boul. des Laurentides from Terrebonne.
Trois-Rivières: No change. 
Vaudreuil: Largely replaces Vaudreuil—Soulanges. Loses Les Cèdres and Pointe-des-Cascades to Beauharnois—Soulanges.
Ville-Marie—Le Sud-Ouest—Île-des-Sœurs: Loses the territory north of Boul. Robert-Bourassa and east of Av. Viger (including Saint Helen's Island and Notre Dame Island) to Laurier—Sainte-Marie; Loses the territory west of Rue Notre-Dame and Av. Atwater to Notre-Dame-de-Grâce—Westmount. 
Vimy: Loses the territory east of Boul. des Laurentides to Alfred-Pellan.

Manitoba
On December 6, 2022, the Federal Electoral Boundaries Commission for Manitoba released their final report, submitting to the House of Commons the following ridings:

Brandon—Souris: Gains Sioux Valley Dakota Nation plus the part of the Rural Municipality of Wallace – Woodworth that it exclaves, and the CFB Shilo area from Dauphin—Swan River—Neepawa; Gains the Municipality of Pembina from Portage—Lisgar. 
Churchill—Keewatinook Aski: Loses the Peonan Point area and the remainder of Little Saskatchewan 48 to Selkirk—Interlake—Eastman.
Elmwood—Transcona: Loses area north of Leighton Avenue and west of Raleigh Street to Kildonan—St. Paul; Gains the Navin, Norcan and Dugald areas from Provencher. 
Kildonan—St. Paul: Loses the Winnipeg neighbourhood of Leila North to Winnipeg North; Gains the area north of Leighton Avenue and west of Raleigh Street from Elmwood—Transcona; Gains that part of the Rural Municipality of Springfield north of Springfield Road and west of Spruce Road (Oakbank area) from Provencher. 
Portage—Lisgar: Loses the Municipality of Pembina to Brandon—Souris; Loses the Municipality of Norfolk Treherne and the area around Long Plain 6 to Riding Mountain.
Provencher: Loses the Navin, Norcan and Dugald areas to Elmwood—Transcona; Loses that part of the Rural Municipality of Springfield north of Springfield Road and west of Spruce Road (Oakbank area) to Kildonan—St. Paul.
Riding Mountain: Largely replaces Dauphin—Swan River—Neepawa. Loses the Sioux Valley Dakota Nation plus the part of the Rural Municipality of Wallace – Woodworth that it exclaves, and the CFB Shilo area to Brandon—Souris; Gains the Municipality of Norfolk Treherne and the area around Long Plain 6 to Portage—Lisgar. 
Selkirk—Interlake—Eastman: Gains the Peonan Point area and the remainder of Little Saskatchewan 48 from Churchill—Keewatinook Aski; Loses the Rural Municipality of Rosser to Winnipeg West.
St. Boniface—St. Vital: Gains the neighbourhood of Minnetonka from Winnipeg South
Winnipeg Centre: Gains the Winnipeg neighbourhoods of North Point Douglas, Lord Selkirk Park and the eastern half of Dufferin from Winnipeg North
Winnipeg North: Loses the Winnipeg neighbourhoods of North Point Douglas, Lord Selkirk Park and the eastern half of Dufferin to Winnipeg Centre; Gains the Winnipeg neighbourhood of Leila North from Kildonan—St. Paul
Winnipeg South: Loses the Winnipeg neighbourhood of Minnetonka to St. Boniface—St. Vital; Loses the Winnipeg neighbourhoods of Whyte Ridge and Linden Ridge to Winnipeg South Centre. 
Winnipeg South Centre: Gains the Winnipeg neighbourhoods of Whyte Ridge and Linden Ridge from Winnipeg South; loses the Winnipeg neighbourhoods of Tuxedo, Tuxedo South, Old Tuxedo and Edgeland to Winnipeg West. 
Winnipeg West: Replaces Charleswood—St. James—Assiniboia—Headingley. Gains the Rural Municipality of Rosser from Selkirk—Interlake—Eastman.

Saskatchewan
On December 6, 2022, the Federal Electoral Boundaries Commission for Saskatchewan released their final report, submitting to the House of Commons the following ridings:

Battlefords—Lloydminster—Meadow Lake: Replaces Battlefords—Lloydminster. Gains the Beaver Lake, Spiritwood, Meadow Lake, Loon Lake and the remainder of the Medstead Rural Municipalities, including enclosed Indian Reserves, Villages and the City of Meadow Lake from Desnethé—Missinippi—Churchill River. Loses the Rural Municipalities of Eye Hill, Grass Lake, Tramping Lake, Reford, Rosemount, Heart's Hill, Progress, Mariposa, Grandview, Antelope Park, Prairiedale, Oakdale, Winslow and all enclosed towns and villages in those RMs to Swift Current—Grasslands—Kindersley. 
Carlton Trail—Eagle Creek: Gains the Rural Municipalities of St. Louis, Invergordon, and Flett's Springs, including the One Arrow 95 Indian Reserve, and the villages of St. Louis and Beatty from Prince Albert; Gains the Rural Municipality of Lake Lenore and the Town of St. Brieux from Yorkton—Melville; Gains the Humboldt Lake area, the Rural Municipality of Blucher, and the municipalities of Allan, Bradwell and Clavet from Moose Jaw—Lake Centre—Lanigan; Gains the remainder of the Rural Municipality of Corman Park in the riding of Saskatoon—Grasswood; Loses the Rural Municipalities of Biggar, Perdue, Mountain View, Marriott, Harris, Montrose, Pleasant Valley, St. Andrews, Milden and Fertile Valley, including all enclosed towns and villages to Swift Current—Grasslands—Kindersley. Loses newly annexed territory by the City of Saskatoon to Saskatoon West, but also gains all of Saskatoon West not in the City of Saskatoon.
Desnethé—Missinippi—Churchill River: Loses the Beaver Lake, Spiritwood, Meadow Lake, Loon Lake and the remainder of the Medstead Rural Municipalities, including enclosed Indian Reserves, Villages and the City of Meadow Lake to Battlefords—Lloydminster—Meadow Lake; Loses the Rural Municipalities of Big River, Canwood, Lakeland, plus Prince Albert National Park, and the remainder of the Rural Municipalites of Leask, Shellbrook, Paddowckwood and Torchwood, plus all enclosed and partially enclosed Indian Reserves, Towns and Villages to Prince Albert.
Moose Jaw—Lake Centre—Lanigan: Gains the remainder of the Rural Municipality of Prairie Rose from Regina—Qu'Appelle; Gains the Rural Municipalities of Maple Bush, Enfield, Chaplin, Wheatlands, Caron, Shamrock, Rodgers, Hillsborough, Gravelbourg, Sutton, and Lake Johnston plus all enclosed towns and villages from Cypress Hills—Grasslands; Loses the Humboldt Lake area, the Rural Municipality of Blucher, and the municipalities of Allan, Bradwell and Clavet to Carlton Trail—Eagle Creek; Loses all newly annexed territory by the City of Regina to Regina—Lewvan (west of McCarthy Blvd) or Regina—Qu'Appelle (east of McCarthy); gains the parts of Regina—Lewvan and Regina—Wascana (south of Highway 33) not in the City of Regina. 
Prince Albert: Gains the Rural Municipalities of Big River, Canwood, Lakeland, plus Prince Albert National Park, and the remainder of the Rural Municipalites of Leask, Shellbrook, Paddowckwood and Torchwood, plus all enclosed and partially enclosed Indian Reserves, Towns and Villages from Desnethé—Missinippi—Churchill River; Loses the Rural Municipalities of Arborfield and Moose Range, and the municipalities of Tobin Lake, Carrot River and Arborfield to Yorkton—Melville; Loses the Rural Municipalities of St. Louis, Invergordon, and Flett's Springs, including the One Arrow 95 Indian Reserve, and the villages of St. Louis and Beatty to Carlton Trail—Eagle Creek.
Regina—Lewvan: Gains the area south of 4th Avenue and West of Albert Street in Regina from Regina—Qu'Appelle; Loses all of the City of Regina north of 1st Avenue and east of McCarthy Blvd to Regina—Qu'Appelle; Gains all newly annexed territory by the City of Regina west of McCarthy Blvd from Moose Jaw—Lake Centre—Lanigan; loses the parts not in the City of Regina to Moose Jaw—Lake Centre—Lanigan. 
Regina—Qu'Appelle: Loses the remainder of the Rural Municipality of Prairie Rose to Moose Jaw—Lake Centre—Lanigan; Loses the Rural Municipalities of Big Quill, Elfros and Ituna Bon Accord plus all enclosed Indian Reserves, towns and villages to Yorkton—Melville; Loses the area south of 4th Avenue and West of Albert Street in Regina to Regina—Lewvan; Gains all of the City of Regina north of 1st Avenue and east of McCarthy Blvd from Regina—Lewvan and Moose Jaw—Lake Centre—Lanigan; Loses all newly annexed territory in the city of Regina south of the CP Railway to Regina—Wascana; Gains that part of Regina—Wascana between Highways 1 and 33 not in the City of Regina. 
Regina—Wascana: Loses all of its territory outside the City of Regina to either Moose Jaw—Lake Centre—Lanigan (west of Highway 33) or Regina—Qu'Appelle (east of Highway 33). Gains newly annexed territory in the City of Regina from Regina—Qu'Appelle north of Highway 1. 
Saskatoon South: Replaces Saskatoon—Grasswood. Loses all of its territory outside of the City of Saskatoon to Carlton Trail—Eagle Creek. Loses the area north of 8th Street and west of Highway 11 to Saskatoon—University.
Saskatoon—University: Gains that part of Saskatoon—Grasswood north of 8th Street and west of Highway 11. 
Saskatoon West: Western border reconfigured to follow the new Saskatoon city limits. 
Souris—Moose Mountain: Gains the Rural Municipalities of Stonehenge, Lake of the Rivers, Willow Bunch, Old Post and Poplar Valley, and all enclosed towns and villages from Cypress Hills—Grasslands.
Swift Current—Grasslands—Kindersley: Replaces Cypress Hills—Grasslands. Loses the Rural Municipalities of Stonehenge, Lake of the Rivers, Willow Bunch, Old Post and Poplar Valley, and all enclosed towns and villages to Souris—Moose Mountain. Loses the Rural Municipalities of Maple Bush, Enfield, Chaplin, Wheatlands, Caron, Shamrock, Rodgers, Hillsborough, Gravelbourg, Sutton, and Lake Johnston plus all enclosed towns and villages to Moose Jaw—Lake Centre—Lanigan. Gains the Rural Municipalities of Eye Hill, Grass Lake, Tramping Lake, Reford, Rosemount, Heart's Hill, Progress, Mariposa, Grandview, Antelope Park, Prairiedale, Oakdale, Winslow and all enclosed towns and villages in those RMs from Battlefords—Lloydminster. Gainsthe Rural Municipalities of Biggar, Perdue, Mountain View, Marriott, Harris, Montrose, Pleasant Valley, St. Andrews, Milden and Fertile Valley, including all enclosed towns and villages from Carlton Trail—Eagle Creek.
Yorkton—Melville: Loses the Rural Municipality of Lake Lenore and the Town of St. Brieux to Carlton Trail—Eagle Creek; Gains the Rural Municipalities of Arborfield and Moose Range, and the municipalities of Tobin Lake, Carrot River and Arborfield from Prince Albert; Gains the Rural Municipalities of Big Quill, Elfros and Ituna Bon Accord plus all enclosed Indian Reserves, towns and villages from Regina—Qu'Appelle.

Objections from MPs
After the publication of each commissions final report, the reports were referred to the House of Commons Standing Committee on Procedure and House Affairs. MPs could file written objections to a report with the Standing Committee within 30 days of the tabling of the final report. Members had to specify the provisions objected to in the reports and the reasons for their objection, and objections had to be signed by at least 10 MPs.

After the filling deadline, the Standing Committee had 30 days to consider the objections, with a 30 day extension available, after which the reports along with a copy of all the objections, including those the Standing Committee did not support, were returned to the commissions through the Speaker of the House of Commons.

The commissions had to consider the objections within the following 30 days, but they were not compelled to make any changes as a result of the objections.

New Brunswick

Conservative MP John Williamson objected to the name "Saint John—St. Croix", and proposed instead the name "New Brunswick Southwest". The Standing Committee supported the objection.

The standing committee completed its consideration of the New Brunswick Final Report on February 16, 2023, and reported the objection back to the House of Commons on March 20, 2023.

Newfoundland and Labrador
There were no MP Objections to the Newfoundland and Labrador Final Report.

The standing committee completed its consideration of the Newfoundland and Labrador Final Report on January 31, 2023, and reported the lack of objections back to the House of Commons on February 8, 2023.

Nova Scotia
Liberal MP Sean Fraser objected to the division of Antigonish County and Pictou County into separate electoral districts (Cape Breton—Canso—Antigonish and Pictou—Eastern Shore respectively), objected to the inclusion of Antigonish County in Cape Breton—Canso, and objected to the inclusion of  Lawrencetown, Porters Lake and Chezzetcook in Pictou—Eastern Shore. The Standing Committee supported the objection, with the 4 Conservative Members of the committee dissenting.
 In a separate objection, Liberal MP Sean Fraser also objected to to the name "Pictou—Eastern Shore" and proposed instead the name "Central Nova". The Standing Committee supported the objection.
Liberal MP Jaime Battiste objected to the territory exchange between Cape Breton—Canso and Sydney—Victoria. The Standing Committee supported the objection, with the 4 Conservative Members of the committee dissenting.
Liberal MP Lena Diab objected to the removal of the area around Larry Uteck Boulevard from Halifax West, and objected to the inclusion of the Chebucto Peninsula in Halifax West. The Standing Committee supported the objection, with the 4 Conservative Members of the committee dissenting.

The standing committee completed its consideration of the Nova Scotia Final Report on February 14, 2023, and reported the objections back to the House of Commons on March 20, 2023.

Prince Edward Island
There were no MP Objections to the Prince Edward Island Final Report.

The standing committee completed its consideration of the Prince Edward Island Final Report on January 31, 2023, and reported the lack of objections back to the House of Commons on February 8, 2023.

Manitoba
New Democratic MP Niki Ashton and Conservative MP James Bezan jointly objected to the removal of Little Saskatchewan First Nation and part of Lake St. Martin First Nation from Churchill—Keewatinook Aski. The Standing Committee supported the objection.
New Democratic MP Daniel Blaikie objected to the inclusion of Navin, Norcan and Dugald in Elmwood—Transcona. The Standing Committee supported the objection, with the 4 Conservative Members of the committee dissenting.

The standing committee completed its consideration of the Manitoba Final Report on February 16, 2023, and reported the objections back to the House of Commons on March 20, 2023.

Saskatchewan
New Democratic MP Daniel Blaikie objected to the boundaries in Saskatoon, and proposed instead that the commission restore to the proposed "Saskatoon Centre" from the Initial Proposal. The Standing Committee supported the objection, with the 4 Conservative Members of the committee dissenting.
Conservative MP Warren Steinley and Conservative MP Andrew Scheer jointly objected to the territory exchange between Regina—Lewvan and Regina—Qu'Appelle. The Standing Committee supported the objection.
Conservative MP Andrew Scheer objected to the removal of Wynyard and Ituna from Regina—Qu'Appelle. The Standing Committee supported the objection.

The standing committee completed its consideration of the Saskatchewan Final Report on February 16, 2023, and reported the objections back to the House of Commons on March 20, 2023.

See also
2012 Canadian federal electoral redistribution

Notes

References

Electoral redistributions in Canada